{{DISPLAYTITLE:33 1/3 RPM}}
 RPM may refer to:
The playing speed, in rotations per minute, of LP records
The playing speed of some extended play records